Sandy Creek Airpark  is a private residential airpark located in the East Bay Sector, 10 miles (16 km) southeast of the central business district of Panama City, in Bay County, Florida, United States. This airport has one dusk-to-dawn lighted runway, and a green-white beacon.  The facility is used primarily by residents/association members, their tenants and guests, and members of the EAA Chapter 202. 

Phase I of Sandy Creek Airpark was completed in 1983, followed by Phase II in 1988. Sandy Creek Airpark will soon develop Phase III. Improvements will include extending the runway, in addition to residential and light commercial development. 

Panama City-Bay County International Airport planned to relocate outside the city limits to the West Bay Sector in 2009. Sandy Creek Airpark planned to accommodate the general aviation community of eastern Bay County and western Gulf County (Mexico Beach).

Facilities and aircraft 
There are 20 aircraft based at this airport: 75% single-engine and 25% ultralight.

References

External links 
Sandy Creek Airpark Owners Association
Sandy Creek Airpark Realty, LLC

Airports in Florida
Residential airparks
Transportation buildings and structures in Bay County, Florida
1983 establishments in Florida
Airports established in 1983